Kot-in-Action Creative Artel is an independent video game company  headquartered in Del Rio, Texas and founded in 2008 by Alexander Zubov. Consisting of a core team of three people, they developed the Steel Storm series for Microsoft Windows, Mac OS X, and Linux platforms.

On November 25, 2010, Unigine Corp announced a competition to support Linux game development. They agreed to give away a free license of their Unigine engine to anyone willing to develop and release a game with a Linux native client, although they would also grant the team a Windows license. The competition ran until December 10, 2010, with a considerable number of entries being submitted. Due to the unexpected response, Unigine decided to extend the offer to the three best applicants, with each getting full Unigine licenses. The winners were announced on December 13, 2010, with Kot-In-Action Creative Artel being one of the developers selected.

References

External links 
Kot-in-Action Creative Artel official website

Video game companies established in 2008
Video game companies of the United States
Video game development companies
2008 establishments in Texas